Lara Della Mea (born 10 January 1999) is an Italian World Cup alpine ski racer. She competed at the FIS Alpine World Ski Championships 2019, winning a medal.

World Championship results

References

External links
 

1999 births
Living people
Italian female alpine skiers
People from Tarvisio
Alpine skiers at the 2022 Winter Olympics
Olympic alpine skiers of Italy
Alpine skiers of Gruppo Sportivo Esercito
Sportspeople from Friuli-Venezia Giulia